Yadahalli  is a panchayat village in the southern state of Karnataka, India. Administratively, Yadahalli is under Bilagi Taluka of Bagalkot District in Karnataka. It have Karnataka's first chinkara wildlife sanctuary named Yadahalli Chinkara Wildlife Sanctuary. The village of Yadahalli is 9 km by road east of Mantur and 22 km by road northwest of the town of Bilagi. Yadahalli is on the south shore of the Krishna River.

Divisions 
The Yadahalli gram panchayat oversees two villages: Yadahalli, and Amalazari.

Notes

External links
 

Villages in Bagalkot district